Porto San Giorgio is a comune (town or municipality) in the Province of Fermo, in the Marche region of Italy. It has approximately 15,700 inhabitants (2021) and it is located on the coast of the Adriatic Sea.

History
Already famous at the times of Pliny the Elder as Navale Firmanorum and cited by Strabo and in the Tabula Peutingeriana as Castrum Firmanorum (Citadel of Fermo), it was bound to the development of the port of Fermo, probably situated to the estuary of the Ete river and connected to the city of Fermo by the Pompeiana road.

In 2013 the promenade of Porto San Giorgio was immortalized by photographer Savino Marè. The photo, entitled "Alba a Porto San Giorgio", helped make the City and the entire region famous at the tourist level, receiving the award at the International Tourism Exchange in Milan.

Railways
The Porto San Giorgio-Fermo station is on the Ancona-Pescara railway line of the Ferrovie dello Stato.

Porto San Giorgio was connected to Amandola through a  narrow gauge railway with  track, the so-called "Italian gauge", which was disabled in 1956.

Landmarks
The Chiesa di San Giorgio was completed in 1834, replacing an earlier building which had housed the now-dispersed Porto San Giorgio Altarpiece by Carlo Crivelli. Tiepolo Fortress was built in 1267 by Lorenzo Tiepolo.

People
Silvia Ballestra, writer, was born here in 1969

Twin towns
 Gessopalena, Italy
 Biograd na Moru, Croatia
 Birżebbuġa, Malta

References

Cities and towns in the Marche